List of Iran's parliament representatives (11th term) or "List of the representatives of Iran's Islamic Consultative Assembly (11th term)", includes a list which mentions all 290 members of the Iran's Islamic Consultative Assembly at the 11th term. The Legislative elections were held in Islamic Republic of Iran on 21 February 2020; four years after the previous legislative election in 2016. The second round of the Islamic Consultative Assembly elections was also held on September 11, 2020. The list is as follows:

See also 
 List of Iran's parliament representatives (10th term)
 List of Iran's parliament representatives (9th term)
 List of Iran's parliament representatives (8th term)
 List of Iran's parliament representatives (7th term)
 List of Iran's parliament representatives (6th term)

References 

Islamic Consultative Assembly elections
Islamic Consultative Assembly
 
Jalal Rashidi Kochi Wikipedia in Persian